The 1960 Western Michigan Broncos football team represented Western Michigan University in the Mid-American Conference (MAC) during the 1960 NCAA University Division football season.  In their fourth season under head coach Merle Schlosser, the Broncos compiled a 4–4–1 record (2–4 against MAC opponents), finished in fifth place in the MAC, and were outscored by their opponents, 173 to 106.  The team played its home games at Waldo Stadium in Kalamazoo, Michigan.

Center Leroy Repischak was the team captain. Offensive tackle Jim Habel received the team's most outstanding player award.

Schedule

References

Western Michigan
Western Michigan Broncos football seasons
Western Michigan Broncos football